Ernest Hall may refer to:

 Ernest Hall (judge) (1844–1920), English-born lawyer and judge from New York
 Ernest Hall (cricketer) (1851–1936), English cricketer
 Ernest Hall (businessman) (born 1930), English businessman and pianist
 Ernest Hall (footballer) (1916–1944), footballer for Brighton & Hove Albion, Newcastle United and Stoke City
 Ernest Hall (British Columbia politician) (1929–1987), English-born merchant and political figure in British Columbia
 Ernest Hall (Arizona politician), member of the Arizona State Senate
 Ernest Lenard Hall (born 1940), professor of mechanical engineering and computer science
 Ernest Thomas Hall, Australian public servant

See also
 Trevor Hall (rugby league) (Ernest Trevor Hall, 1905–1961), New Zealand rugby league footballer and coach